Relentless is a 1989 American crime thriller film directed by William Lustig and starring Judd Nelson, Robert Loggia and Leo Rossi. The film follows two LAPD officers on a hunt for a serial killer.

Relentless was the first in a series of four films starring Leo Rossi as detective Sam Dietz trying to stop a serial killer. The three sequels were all filmed and released within three consecutive years from 1992 to 1994.

Plot 
Sam Dietz (Leo Rossi) is a rookie Los Angeles detective recently transferred from New York City. He is paired up with veteran detective Bill Malloy (Robert Loggia) in order to find and stop a serial killer. The killer is Arthur "Buck" Taylor (Judd Nelson), the son of a former LAPD cop whose motive for killing is frustration over not having been accepted to the force and failure in the eyes of his father. Taylor chooses his targets by randomly looking up their names in the phone book and skillfully covering up his tracks by using his skills and knowledge that he learned while on the force. While in pursuit of Taylor, both Dietz and Malloy become his next planned targets for murder.

Cast
 Judd Nelson as Arthur "Buck" Taylor
 Robert Loggia as Bill Malloy
 Leo Rossi as Sam Dietz
 Meg Foster as Carol Dietz
 Patrick O'Bryan as Todd Arthur
 Ken Lerner as Arthur
 Mindy Seeger as Francine
 Angel Tompkins as Carmen
 Beau Starr as Ike Taylor
 Ron Taylor as Captain Blakely
 Roy Brocksmith as The Coroner

Production 
After the success of Maniac Cop, producer Leonard Shapiro of Shapiro-Glickenhaus Entertainment wanted to do another picture with director William Lustig, and presented him with a bunch of scripts that had been submitted to the company, Lustig came across a script by Phil Alden Robinson called "Sunset Slayer" that he thought was especially good, but Shapiro's company ran into financial problems, Lustig ended up making the film for CineTel Films, and changed the title of the film to Relentless, which was the original title of the 1985 Sam Raimi movie Crimewave, Lustig had contacted Raimi and asked him permission to use the title, Raimi approved, and he was given a special thanks in the film’s end credits.

Reception 
On Rotten Tomatoes the film has an approval rating of 33% based on reviews from 6 critics.

Direct-to-Video Sequels 
 Dead On: Relentless II (1992)
 Relentless 3 (1993)
 Relentless IV: Ashes to Ashes (1994)

References

External links 
 
 
 

1989 films
1980s crime thriller films
American police detective films
American serial killer films
CineTel Films films
Films directed by William Lustig
American crime thriller films
Fictional portrayals of the Los Angeles Police Department
Films scored by Jay Chattaway
1980s English-language films
1980s American films